Feline spongiform encephalopathy (FSE) is a disease that affects the brains of felines. It is caused by proteins called prions. FSE is thought to be related or identical to bovine spongiform encephalopathy (BSE). This disease is known to affect domestic and captive feline species. This infectious agent might be spread by both haematogenous and nervous pathways. Like BSE, this disease can take several years to develop. It is probable, but not proven, that the affected animals contract the disease by eating contaminated bovine meat.

Symptoms and signs
Clinical signs of FSE typically develop gradually in housecats. Initial signs of the condition include behavioral changes such as aggression, timidity, and hiding. Other commonly observed motor signs include gait abnormalities and ataxia, which typically affect the hind legs first. Affected cats may also display poor judgement of distance, and some cats may develop a rapid, crouching, hypermetric gait. Another common symptom is hyperesthesia. Some affected cats may exhibit an abnormal head tilt, tremors, a vacant stare, excessive salivation, decreased grooming behaviors, polyphagia, polydipsia, and dilated pupils. Once signs of FSE appear, the disease progresses and results in death within a few weeks to 3 months.

Ataxia was observed to last for about 8 weeks in the affected animals. The ultimate result is death of the infected animals.

Diagnosis
This disease can only be confirmed at the post-mortem, which includes identification of bilaterally symmetrical vacuolation of the neuropil and vacuolation in neurones. Lesions are likely to be found in basal ganglia, cerebral cortex and thalamus of the brain.

Treatment
This is a terminal condition and there is currently no specific treatment for the disease.

Epidemiology
This disease was first reported in domestic cats within the United Kingdom in 1990. Since 1990, cases have been reported in other countries and other feline species in captivity, although most affected felines originated in the UK.

References

Cat diseases
Transmissible spongiform encephalopathies
Foodborne illnesses